Let's do it! Armenia is a movement in Armenia, based upon the Let's Do It! World international ecological movement. In 2012, from 24 March until 25 September, the movement aimed to carry out the Pan-Armenian volunteer initiative "Armenia Without Garbage" which involved a number of activities (Pan-Armenian cleanup campaign, seminars etc.).The basis of the worldwide movement "Let's Do It! World" is the big cleanup (Let's do it! 2008) organized in Estonia in 2008, during which more than 50 000 volunteers were able to clean up Estonia from 10 000 tons of waste.

Participation 
All the individuals and organizations which worry about the ecological problems of Armenia and can make a contribution on a voluntary basis within the framework of the movement were welcome to take part in this campaign.
They called everyone (individuals, ecological, youth and other organizations, schools, HEIs) to join the movement, coordinate and carry out clean-up and educational activities in their favorite places.

Armenia Without Garbage 
Let's do it! Armenia was going to unite and carry out the biggest Pan-Armenian clean-up under the slogan "Armenia Without Garbage" on 15 September 2012.

The initiative aimed to unite everybody's strength in order to clean Armenia's nature and historical and cultural sites from waste in a day with joint efforts. In order to raise the awareness among society, they also planned to organize educational and informational activities about waste sorting and recycling during the campaign.

Partners 
 Let's Do It! World
 Aarhus Centers
 Acopian Center for the Environment
 Association of Young Journalists NGO
 Armat Press Club 
 Anania Shirakatsi Armenian National Lyce'e 
 Armenian Society for the Protection of Birds
 ArmYouth.am 
 Armenian Environmental Network
 Armenia Tree Project
 Consumers Support Center
 Eritasard.am 
 Econews.am
 HotTv
 "Hetq" Online Newspaper
 Kanachastan NGO
 Life Colors ecological NGO
 Lyunse youth radio program
 Max Liberty radio program
 "Ohanyan" Educational Complex
 "Poqrik Ishkhan" Educational Complex 
 Tapan Eco-Club
 The Student Council of Armenian Diaspora
 The Labaratory 
 Yeghvard Youth Environmental NGO
 Youth Union of Environmental Economists
 WWF Armenia

See also 
Let's do it! 2008

References 
 https://web.archive.org/web/20171110165514/http://www.armenia-environment.org/lets-do-it-armenia-2/
 http://www.a1plus.am/en/social/2012/01/20/environment
 http://hetq.am/eng/news/9352/

External links 
 
Armenia-Let's do it! World

Waste organizations
Outdoor education organizations
Environmental organizations based in Armenia
Litter
Volunteer cooperatives